is the fourth game in the Parodius franchise, a series of parody shooters produced by Konami. The gameplay is stylistically very similar to the Gradius series, but the graphics and music are intentionally absurd. The game contains a large number of Japanese voice samples shouted out in a style similar to that of a game show host. Unlike the previous two titles, Jikkyō Oshaberi Parodius was not created as an arcade game. It was first released on the Super Famicom in 1995 and then ported and updated for the PlayStation and Sega Saturn in 1996.

Gameplay
The gameplay is very similar to the Gradius series, with a few exceptions.  For one, there is an impressive array of characters to choose from.  Each one of these characters utilizes different weapons and abilities as the player obtains power-ups.  The second main difference is the addition of bell power-ups, from the TwinBee series.  These bells act as one-time power-ups, allowing the player to destroy every enemy on screen, fire huge beams of energy, etc.

The playable characters in this game include:

Parodius Originals: Takohiko, Belial, Sue, Memim, Mike, Ran, Soitsu and Doitsu.
Gradius Ships: Vic Viper, Lord British
Twin Bee Team: TwinBee, Winbee
Penguins: Pentarou, Hanako
Miracle Upa: Upa, Rupa

Music
The music in Jikkyō Oshaberi Parodius is also unique. It ranges from a remix of the 70's disco song "That's the Way I Like It," to remixes of Bach, to sped-up versions of tunes from other Konami games.  All of the songs are done in a unique style, with loud saw wave synths and fluctuating BPM.  The music was produced by the Konami Kukeiha Club.

Notable features

Jikkyō Oshaberi Parodius translates to something like "Chatting Parodius Live!".  As the name implies, a large number of voice samples are present in the game.  As the player progresses, Japanese voice-overs provide information about how well the player is doing, what enemies they are fighting, etc.

The game also features extremely advanced graphics for the time period and system; most notable are the fully scalable 3D polygons present in one of the stages.  These graphics are made possible by the inclusion of the SA-1 chip, a special graphics chip used in many games towards the latter part of the Super NES's lifespan.

A feature exclusive to the PlayStation and Sega Saturn version is the goal of collecting fairies (worth 10000 points each) hidden throughout each stage, getting 70 fairies unlocks Stage Select, getting another 70 fairies unlocks Dracula-kun and Kid-Dracula as playable characters. Other features (which can be enabled on the Options Menu) include changing the "OH!" powerup into a Slot Machine game that grants the player bell power-ups depending on the color of the bells the slots stopped. The Saturn version includes an "Extra" mode that rearranges enemy formations in the main game. The PlayStation version instead features "Accident" levels, small segments that randomly take place once a stage ends and the ability to turn off the announcer during gameplay.

In addition to the standard game mode, they also include two Omake modes:
Omake 1, a stage where the main objective is to get the highest score by collecting coins, destroying toys, and hitting certain enemies. When hit, the player's character instantly revives on the spot, much like Salamander.

Omake 2 (P-1 Grand Prin (sic) in Bellka), a racing parody. The goal is to complete the race as fast as possible by collecting speed-ups (while trying not to crash) and by defeating four mini-bosses with easy attack patterns.

Ports

PlayStation / Sega Saturn 
This game was ported for the PlayStation and Sega Saturn in 1996 with the title, Jikkyō Oshaberi Parodius: forever with me. This port not only added improved graphics and sound from the Super Famicom game, but some altered levels and bosses, including a cheat to replace 'Tokimeki People's Dance' with an enhanced version, 'Days Of The Dream's Memories'. Also added were several "Omake" stages and an unlockable Dracula-kun (Kid Dracula) as a playable character. In a two-player game, both players can now choose to play simultaneously instead of just alternately in the Super Famicom game.

PlayStation Portable 
The PlayStation and Saturn version of the game was also ported to the Sony PSP as a part of the compilation titled Parodius Portable in 2007. One notable change was the first stage's music, "I Remember That!", which was an instrumental remix of "That's the Way (I Like It)" by K.C. and the Sunshine Band. The PSP game replaced the remix with "Brilliant2U" by Naoki Maeda from Dance Dance Revolution to avoid copyright infringement.

Notes

References

1995 video games
Cooperative video games
Japan-exclusive video games
Parodius
PlayStation (console) games
PlayStation Portable games
Horizontally scrolling shooters
Sega Saturn games
Super Nintendo Entertainment System games
Multiplayer and single-player video games
Video games developed in Japan